Boyton End may refer to:
Boyton End, Essex, England
Boyton End, Suffolk, England